Graham Hingangaroa Smith  (born 1950) is a New Zealand Māori academic and educationalist of Ngāti Porou, Ngāi Tahu, Ngāti Apa and Ngāti Kahungunu descent. He is a Fellow of the Royal Society Te Apārangi.

Career 
Smith grew up with his grandmother in the Wairarapa region. He received a scholarship to a private boarding school in Auckland, which led to university and a teaching career.

After a Diploma of Teaching and a PhD at the University of Auckland, he was Pro Vice-Chancellor (Māori) there for five years. He is now CEO and Vice-Chancellor at Te Whare Wānanga o Awanuiārangi. He is also a principal investigator at Ngā Pae o te Māramatanga.

Awards 
In the 2014 Queen's Birthday Honours, Smith was appointed a Companion of the New Zealand Order of Merit for services to Māori and education. In March 2021, Smith was made a Fellow of the Royal Society Te Apārangi, recognising his "research and practice have been foundational to the development of Kaupapa Māori theorizing and ‘transforming praxis’".

Personal life 
He is married to fellow academic Linda Tuhiwai Smith.

Publications 
 The development of kaupapa Maori: Theory and praxis. 1997.
 Indigenous struggle for the transformation of education and schooling. 2003.
Protecting and respecting indigenous knowledge. Chapter by Smith, Graham Hingangaroa in: Reclaiming Indigenous voice and vision, 2000.
Reform and Maori educational crisis: A grand illusion. 1991.
“Do you guys hate Aucklanders too?” Youth: voicing difference from the rural heartland. 2002.

References

External links
 google scholar 
 institutional homepage

Living people
1950 births
Heads of universities and colleges in New Zealand
New Zealand Māori academics
Ngāti Porou people
Ngāi Tahu people
Ngāti Apa people
Ngāti Kahungunu people
Academic staff of Te Whare Wānanga o Awanuiārangi
University of Auckland alumni
Academic staff of the University of Auckland
Companions of the New Zealand Order of Merit
Fellows of the Royal Society of New Zealand